Annamitta Kai is a 1972 Indian Tamil-language film written by G. Subramanium and directed by M. Krishnan Nair, starring M. G. Ramachandran, Jayalalithaa and Bharathi. It was produced by Ramachandra Productions, owned by M. S. Sivaswamy. Annamitta Kai was Ramachandran's last black and white film.

Plot 

To repair the past errors of their father, the half brothers Durairaj and Selvaraj exchange identities, making Selvaraj the heir. Durairaj is going to take care of Selvaraj's blind mother, and try to get his brother back to a virtuous life.

Cast 
M. G. Ramachandran  as Durairaj (Raju)
Jayalalithaa  as Seetha
 Bharathi as Doctor Kalpana
 Pandari Bai as Sivagami, Selvaraj's mother
 M. N. Nambiar as Selvaraj
 R. S. Manohar  as The manager Kannaga Rathnam, Kalpana's father
 V. K. Ramasamy  as postman Yezhaimalai
 Nagesh as The assistant-postman Thangaman
 T. S. Muthaiah as Sadhasivam Bhoopathi, Durai raj & Selvaraj's father
 Geethanjali  as Ladha, girl from Burma
 Manorama  as nurse Thangam
 Seethalakshmi as Chellamma
 S. N. Lakshmi  as Lakshimi, Durairaj's mother
T. K. S. Natarajan as Estate labourer
Master Sekhar  as Durairaj (Child)
 Master Prabhakar  as Selvaraj (Child)

Production 
The song "16 Vayathinilae 17 Pillayamma" was shot at Ashley Estate, Kuttikkanam, with 17 children.

Soundtrack 
The music was composed by K. V. Mahadevan, with lyrics by Vaali.

Release and reception 
This was the last film of Ramachandran while he was in the Dravida Munnetra Kazhagam. After 1 month of release of this film, he has come out from that party and started his own party (All India Anna Dravida Munnetra Kazhagam) on 17 October 1972.

References

External links 
 

1970s Tamil-language films
1972 films
Films directed by M. Krishnan Nair
Films scored by K. V. Mahadevan
Indian black-and-white films